Vladimir Antonovich Zorich (Владимир Антонович Зорич; born 16 December 1937, Moscow) is a Soviet and Russian mathematician, Doctor of Physical and Mathematical Sciences (1969), Professor (1971). Honorary Professor of Moscow State University (2007). He is the author of the well-known textbook "Mathematical Analysis" for students of mathematical, physical and mathematical specialties of higher education, which was reprinted several times and translated into many languages.

Scientific career
VA Zorich is an expert in various fields of mathematical analysis, conformal geometry, and the theory of quasi-conformal mappings. He graduated from the Mechanics and Matheers Faculty of MV Lomonosov Moscow State University in 1960. In 1963 he graduated from the graduate school of the faculty (department of theory of functions and functional analysis) and defended his thesis "Compliance boundaries for some classes of mappings in space", which was noted as outstanding. In 1969 he defended his doctoral thesis "Global reversibility of quasi-conformal mappings of space". Zorich had been teaching in the department of mathematical analysis of Mechanics and Mathematics Faculty: since 1963 - as an assistant, since 1969 - an assistant professor, and since 1971 - a professor.

Notes

References
 math-net.ru
 Zorich's page on the website of Moscow State University

Soviet mathematicians
Living people
1937 births
Academic staff of Moscow State University
20th-century Russian mathematicians
21st-century Russian mathematicians